Éxitos en Vivo (English: Hits Live) is a live album by Mexican-American cumbia group A.B. Quintanilla y Los Kumbia All Starz and the second live album by Mexican-American musician A.B. Quintanilla. It was released on June 20, 2014 by Q-Productions.

Track listing

References

2014 live albums
Kumbia All Starz albums
A. B. Quintanilla albums
Albums produced by A.B. Quintanilla
Spanish-language live albums
Cumbia albums